Nabulsi may refer to:

 People or things from Nablus, a Palestinian city in the West Bank
 Nabulsi soap
 Nabulsi cheese
 Kanafeh, also known as Knafe Nabulsiyye, a traditional pastry made with Nabulsi cheese

People with the surname
 Abd al-Ghani al-Nabulsi, Muslim scholar from Ottoman Empire
 Mohammed Said Nabulsi, Jordanian banker, economist and politician
 Shaker Al-Nabulsi, Jordanian-American author
 Suleiman Nabulsi, Jordanian political figure
 Adham Nabulsi, Palestinian-Jordanian singer
 Mohammed Rateb al-Nabulsi, Syrian writer and Muslim scholar
 Farah Nabulsi, British-Palestinian human rights advocate, film writer, and producer.
 Karma Nabulsi, Oxford academic
 Omar Nimr Nabulsi, Jordanian politician
 Abdel Salam Al Nabulsy, Egyptian actor of Palestinian origin.

Arabic-language surnames